Into Battle may refer to:

Into Battle (novel), a 2001 Australian novel by Garth Nix
Into Battle (thriller), a 1997 historical thriller by the British writer Michael Gilbert
"Into Battle" (poem), a 1915 British war poem by Julian Grenfell
Into Battle with the Art of Noise, 1983 debut album by British synthpop band the Art of Noise
Into Battle, 1984 debut album by heavy metal band Brocas Helm